William Darrach Halsey is an American encyclopaedist and lexicographer.  He is chiefly noted for his work on Collier's Encyclopedia, but was also lead editor of a number of other encyclopaedias and dictionaries.

Bibliography

 Collier's Encyclopedia With Bibliography and Index  (with Bernard Johnston)
 Macmillan dictionary for children (with Christopher G Morris)
 Merit Students Encyclopedia

References

Living people
American encyclopedists
Year of birth missing (living people)
Linguists from the United States